Laconte is an unincorporated community in Cook County, in the U.S. state of Georgia.

History
Laconte was platted about 1853. A post office called Laconte was established in 1888, and remained in operation until 1905.

References

Unincorporated communities in Cook County, Georgia